Amy C. Edmondson is an American scholar of leadership, teaming, and organizational learning. She is currently Professor of Leadership at Harvard Business School.
Edmondson is the author of seven books and more than 75 articles and case studies.
She is best known for her pioneering work on psychological safety, which has helped spawn a large body of academic research in management, healthcare and education over the past 15 years. Her books include “The Fearless Organization,Creating Psychological Safety in the Workplace for Learning, Innovation, and Growth”) and “Teaming: How Organizations Learn, Innovate and Compete in the Knowledge Economy”.

Education 
Edmondson received her PhD in organizational behavior, AM in psychology, and AB in engineering and design from Harvard University.

Career 
Edmondson  studies teaming, psychological safety, and organizational learning, and her articles have been published numerous academic and management outlets, including Administrative Science Quarterly, Academy of Management Journal, Harvard Business Review and California Management Review.

Before joining Harvard, she was Director of Research at Pecos River Learning Centers, where she worked on transformational change in large companies. She also worked as Chief Engineer for architect/inventor Buckminster Fuller.

She has been ranked by the biannual Thinkers50 global list of top management thinkers since 2011 (most recently number 13), and selected in 2019 as the number 1 most influential thinker in Human Resources by HR Magazine.

Awards 
Winner of the 2019 Distinguished Scholar Award from the Organization Development and Change Division of the Academy of Management.
Named the Most Influential International Thinker in Human Resources by HR Magazine in 2019.
Winner of the 2019 Thinkers50 Breakthrough Idea Award for being a “pioneer of psychological safety and author of The Fearless Organization, a ground-breaking blueprint on creating a fear-free culture.”
Ranked #3 in the 2019 Thinkers50 list—a list of world's most influential management thinkers.
The Fearless Organization: Creating Psychological Safety in the Workplace for Learning, Innovation, and Growth (John Wiley & Sons, 2018) was named one of the Best International Non-Fiction Books of 2019 by the Sharjah International Book Fair.
The Fearless Organization: Creating Psychological Safety in the Workplace for Learning, Innovation, and Growth (John Wiley & Sons, 2018) was listed as #14 on the Porchlight Business Best Seller list in 2019.
Winner of the 2018 Sumantra Ghoshal Award for Rigour and Relevance in the Study of Management from London Business School.
Winner of the First Annual OBHR Distinguished Scholar Award from Purdue University's Krannert School of Management in 2017.
Awarded the Doctorem Honoris Causa from Universiteit Maastricht in 2013.
Finalist for the 2019 McKinsey Award for the Best Article in Harvard Business Review for "Cross-Silo Leadership" (May–June 2019) with Tiziana Casciaro and Sujin Jang.

Personal 
Edmondson married George Q. Daley in 1995.

Published works 

 Edmondson, A. (2018). The Fearless Organization: Creating Psychological Safety in the Workplace for Learning, Innovation, and Growth. (John Wiley & Sons) 
 Edmondson, A & Jean-François Harvey (2017). Extreme Teaming: Lessons in Complex, Cross-Sector Leadership. (Emerald Publishing Limited). 
 Edmondson, A & Susan Salter Reynolds. (2016). Building the Future: Big Teaming for Audacious Innovation. (Berret Kohlers Publishers, Inc). 
 Edmondson, A. (2012). Teaming: How Organizations Learn, Innovate, and Compete in the Knowledge Economy. (John Wiley & Sons) 
 Edmondson, A. (2013) Teaming to Innovate. (John Wiley & Sons)

References

Year of birth missing (living people)
Living people
Harvard Business School faculty
American business theorists
Harvard Graduate School of Arts and Sciences alumni